Bae Yeon-ju (Hangul: 배연주, Hanja: 裵延姝; ; born 26 October 1990) is a retired international badminton player from South Korea.

Career 
Bae started playing badminton at aged 10, and first gained international attention in 2006 when she reached the semifinals in the women's singles and won the gold medal as a member of the South Korean mixed team at the BWF World Junior Championships. Bae joined the South Korean national team in 2008 and in the same year she won her first international title at the Indonesia International tournament. In 2010, she became the runner-up at the BWF Superseries Finals after being defeated by Wang Shixian of China with the score 21–13, 21–15.

In 2012, she competed at the London Summer Olympics in the women's singles event, and was defeated by Wang Yihan in the round of 16. In 2013, she won the Korea Masters tournament after beating her team-mate Sung Ji-hyun with the score 21–19, 15–21, 21–9.

In 2016, she competed at the Rio Summer Olympics and was defeated in the last 16 by eventual bronze medallist Nozomi Okuhara.  Bae was one of four Korean players who announced that they would be retiring from the national team at the end of the tournament.

Achievements

BWF World Championships 
Women's singles

Asian Games 
Women's singles

BWF World Junior Championships 
Girls' singles

Asian Junior Championships 
Girls' singles

BWF Superseries 
The BWF Superseries, launched on 14 December 2006 and implemented in 2007, is a series of elite badminton tournaments, sanctioned by Badminton World Federation (BWF). BWF Superseries has two level such as Superseries and Superseries Premier. A season of Superseries features twelve tournaments around the world, which introduced since 2011, with successful players invited to the Superseries Finals held at the year end.

Women's singles

  BWF Superseries Finals tournament
  BWF Superseries Premier tournament
  BWF Superseries tournament

BWF Grand Prix 
The BWF Grand Prix had two levels, the BWF Grand Prix and Grand Prix Gold. It was a series of badminton tournaments sanctioned by the Badminton World Federation (BWF) which was held from 2007 to 2017.

Women's singles

  BWF Grand Prix Gold tournament
  BWF Grand Prix tournament

BWF International Challenge/Series 
Women's singles

  BWF International Challenge tournament
  BWF International Series tournament

Record against selected opponents 
Record against year-end Finals finalists, World Championships semi-finalists, and Olympic quarter-finalists.

References

External links 

 

1990 births
Living people
Sportspeople from South Gyeongsang Province
South Korean female badminton players
Badminton players at the 2012 Summer Olympics
Badminton players at the 2016 Summer Olympics
Olympic badminton players of South Korea
Badminton players at the 2010 Asian Games
Badminton players at the 2014 Asian Games
Asian Games silver medalists for South Korea
Asian Games bronze medalists for South Korea
Asian Games medalists in badminton
Medalists at the 2010 Asian Games
Medalists at the 2014 Asian Games
South Korean Buddhists
20th-century South Korean women
21st-century South Korean women